Problepharoneura is a fossil genus of Tephritid or fruit flies in the family Tephritidae for the sole species, Problepharoneura antiqua, described on the basis of  single male specimen found in Upper Eocene amber from the Dominican Republic.

References

Blepharoneurinae
Tephritidae genera